Aliaksandr Subota (born 28 August 1984) is a Paralympian athlete from Belarus competing mainly in T46 classification track and field events.

Athletics career
Subota first represented his country at a Paralympics in 2004 in Athens, where he competed in the long jump and triple jump, although he failed to achieve a podium finish in either. Subota was back in the Belarus team for the 2008 Summer Paralympics in Beijing, this time competing in just the long jump. He finished fifth. His most successful Paralympics to date was the London Games in 2012. There he competed in both the long jump and triple jump, finishing third in the triple jump to claim his first Paralympic medal.

As well as his Paralympic success, Subota has also claimed medals at both World and European Championship level. He claimed a silver in the triple jump (T46) in the 2013 World Championships in Lyon while he has won three European medals, including a gold in the T46 Javelin in 2016 in Grosseto. This was the first international competition that he had entered into the javelin event.

Personal history
Subota was born in Minsk, Belarus in 1984. He studied sports coaching at Belarusian State University of Physical Training.

Notes

Paralympic athletes of Belarus
Athletes (track and field) at the 2004 Summer Paralympics
Athletes (track and field) at the 2008 Summer Paralympics
Athletes (track and field) at the 2012 Summer Paralympics
Paralympic bronze medalists for Belarus
Living people
1984 births
Medalists at the 2012 Summer Paralympics
Belarusian male long jumpers
Belarusian male triple jumpers
Belarusian male javelin throwers
Artists from Minsk
Paralympic medalists in athletics (track and field)
Paralympic long jumpers
Paralympic triple jumpers
Paralympic javelin throwers